The Bahian Conspiracy, also known as Revolt of the Tailors (after the trade of many of the leaders) and recently also called Revolt of Buzios, was a late eighteenth century slave rebellion in the then Captaincy of Bahia, in the State of Brazil. Unlike the Inconfidência Mineira of 1789, it was a separatist movement with a popular base and extensive black participation.

The objectives of the rebelling baianos were, according to Clóvis Moura, "much more radical," and the proposal to liberate the slaves was one of the main goals. Its leaders and members included "freed blacks, black slaves, pardo slaves, freed pardos, artisans, tailors; those who were from the most oppressed or discriminated classes of Bahia colonial society". With many slaves living in Bahia, the probability of revolts and rebellions ran high. The elites of the area were frightened that if rebellion or revolts did happen, they would be similar to the Haitian Revolution. Because of the significant participation of Bahia's lower classes, the revolt has also been called “The First Brazilian Social Revolution”.

Background 
The revolt's beginnings were established in the city of Salvador by a group of disenfranchised workers seeking to initiate an uprising against Portuguese authority. These marginalized groups resented the Portuguese “for their domination of the country, as well as the apparent wealth that had been accumulated by a handful of free Brazilians”. This revolt was influenced by principles of the Enlightenment and the successful independence movements that resulted . To add to the narrative of civil discontent were the various accusations of corruption and wrongdoing made toward the Relação, Salvador's High Court, which Portuguese authorities failed to properly investigate. It was during this period characterized by internal and external conflict that a conspiracy of rebellion developed. Current evidence suggests that the initial plot began through conversation in 1797 between Francisco Moniz Barreto, Lucas Dantas d'Amorim Tôrres, and Manuel de Santa Anna. The ideology of the rebellion spread via a forty-four line poem authored by Barreto.

On August 12, 1798 a proclamation was posted to a church door in Salvador, Bahia that read: “Be encouraged People of Bahia because the time of our Liberty is approaching. The time when all will be brothers. The time when all will be equal.” It was this written proclamation with no identified author that brought the conspiracy to the attention of Bahia's authorities.

The conspiracy, largely inspired by the events of the French Revolution, had three specific demands: “full independence, the creation of a republic, racial equality, and the complete abolition of slavery”. The revolt included members of many different racial backgrounds. Poor whites, freed-men, slaves, interracial artisans, and radical members of the upper class were among those who joined in the uprising. Lucas Dantas do Amorim Tôrres, a mulatto soldier who was captured and tried for his involvement in the revolt, is quoted explaining to the judges during his trial: "We want a republic in order to breathe freely because we live subjugated and because we're colored and we can't advance and if there was a republic there would be equality for everyone." These demands for equality threatened to undermine Brazil's race-based hierarchy for political and social privileges and were swiftly repressed by crown authorities.

At the onset of the revolt in 1798, there was no organized plan of action. According to Manuel Faustino dos Santos Lira, one of the revolt's coconspirators, the goal was to convince the governor to become the president of the new republic through means of minimal violence.

The 1798 Revolt of the Tailors was appropriately named due to the participation of tailors as well as other members of Bahia's skilled workers such as “soldiers, artisans, [and] carpenters”. Most of the rebels were not slaves but free mulattoes who lived in extreme poverty.

Economic and Political Factors 
Brazil during the eighteenth century was characterized by revolts taking place in many of its cities, notably Minas Gerais, Pernambuco, and Salvador. The northeastern state of Bahia was the center of Brazil's Afro-Brazilian culture during this period, and hosted a large population of slaves. Towards the end of the eighteenth century, Bahia was experiencing economic decline.

From as early as 1504, the French were engaged in trade with communities in Bahia. Roughly four years before, Pedro Alvarés Cabral had first landed at Porto Seguro. At first, the French did not choose to establish formal communities within Bahia, instead establishing truchements, which were where residents of France lived in already-established communities in Bahia in order to facilitate trade between the two countries. This trade was based around the French desire for "brazilwood", which could be used to make anything from furniture to dye for cloth. It is, in fact, the cloth industry that made the French want to be involved with the Bahian economy. This later led to the creation of the first French colony in Brazil.

The truchements started out very friendly, with the French and natives teaching each other their own language and culture. Some Brazilians were even taken to France, where they were warmly welcomed. The relations between the two countries prompted humanists, during the Renaissance, to wonder about the idea of equality in friendship. The French, unlike the Portuguese, allowed the natives to participate in dialogues and create their own speeches. There are also records in France that contain the language of some of the Brazilian natives, and vice versa. Soon enough, the French decided to set up their own colony in Brazil. The way some French citizens justified a colony in Brazil was by pointing out how, along the Brazilian coast, you could find people speaking Portuguese, Spanish, and French, and they seemed to have more favorable relationships with the Frenchmen than they did with the Portuguese.

João de Deus (a leader in the rebellion), would one day speak of the port in his town, saying that “this port will be free to all Foreign Nations to come and trade, bringing cloth and all merchandise to be exchanged for sugar, tobacco and other crops of the land without need of Portugal”. He said this in hopes that France would be the main country to take advantage of the new trade policy.

Main Actors 
The four identified leaders of the revolt were Luís Gonzaga dos Virgens, a soldier, João de Deus do Nascimento, a tailor, Lucas Dantas d’Amorim Torres, a soldier, and Manuel Faustino dos Santos Lira, a tailor. All four were mulattoes and poor. There was a second group (white and of high social status) that authorities did not prosecute, and they were Cipriano Barata de Almeida, Francisco Moniz Barreto d’Aragão, and Lieutenants Hermogenes Francisco d’Aguilar and José Gomes de Oliveira Borges. Lieutenant d’Aguilar, Luís Gonzaga and Lucas Dantas were known to have actively attempted to destabilize the military by recruiting members to the revolutionary movement. These efforts were met with some success. Borges and d’Aguilar were assigned to guard M. Larcher, who was a Frenchman allowed to stay in Salvador as long as he agreed to be under military watch. Larcher inspired both d’Aguilar and Borges and their political views. Larcher was the founder of the Knights of Light, a prominent masonic society that was formally established on July 14, 1797. Most of the original propaganda spread from this organization. The full involvement of the Knights of Light cannot be completely traced, though. It is vague in some spots, and has completely disappeared in others.

On the 8 of November 1799, the government proceeded to the execution of those sentenced for the beginning of the revolt to capital punishment by hanging, in the following order: soldier Lucas Dantas Amorim Torres, an apprentice tailor Manuel Faustino dos Santos Lira, soldier Luís Gonzaga dos Virgens and master tailor João de Deus Nascimento.

Luís Gonzaga dos Virgens 

Luís Gonzaga dos Virgens was a soldier and a leader of the rebellion. He was arrested on August 22 for the spreading of propaganda. When he got to prison, he did not confess, but he did say that “the propaganda was an excellent way to initiate the projected revolution because in this way the people would be encouraged and they would become accustomed little by little to the ideas of liberty and independence”. He was part of the five men sentenced to death after the failure of the revolt. The fifth is not included in this list, as his sentence was later reduced due to him not being as prominent a member of the revolt as the rest.

João de Deus do Nascimento 

João de Deus do Nascimento was a tailor and a leader of the rebellion. He was a strong advocate for free trade, and was against the high taxes and various tributes that the Portugal government had imposed. He was sentenced to death after the failure of the revolt.

Lucas Dantas d’Amorim Torres 

Lucas Dantas d’Amorim Torres was a soldier and a leader of the rebellion. The meetings to plan for the revolution were usually held at his home, since he was the leader by practicality. He was active within his regiment, constantly spreading propaganda. He was actively, yet quietly, trying to destabilize the military. He was also sentenced to death after the failure of the revolt; he refused his last rites.

Manuel Faustino dos Santos Lira 

Manuel Faustino dos Santos Lira was a tailor and a leader of the rebellion. He was a critic of the church, due to them defending slavery. He was the third to be sentenced to death after the revolt, and refused his last rites.

Cipriano Barata de Almeida 

Cipriano Barata de Almeida was a surgeon that graduated from the University of Coimbra; he was a member of the Knights of Light, and spread propaganda throughout the lower classes, despite his own status. For some reason, he tried and was able to convince two people to give up on the conspiracy. He was acquitted after the failure of the revolt, due to his influence in the community.

Francisco Moniz Barreto d’Aragão 

Francisco Moniz Barreto d’Aragão was a teacher; he was a member of the Knights of Light. He wrote poems supporting the ideologies of independence, equality, liberty, and the importance of reason. He was not in Salvador during the end of the revolt, and therefore did not face any punishment.

Hermogenes Francisco d’Aguilar 

Hermogenes Francisco d’Aguilar was a Lieutenant in the army, and was assigned to guard M. Larcher. He was a member of the Knights of Light. Along with Torres, he was trying to destabilize the military. He was sentenced to one year in prison after the failure of the revolt.

José Gomes de Oliveira Borges

Outcomes of the Revolt 
It took less than two weeks for authorities to apprehend and charge forty people tied to the revolt. Out of these forty, thirty-six were brought to trial. Of these there was one university graduate, one of noble heritage, two junior officers in the army, eight military men, and the remainder self-employed artisans including ten tailors. Twenty-four of the forty seized were of mulatto heritage and “almost all were native-born Brazilians”. Those tried were charged with conspiring against the Crown, pillaging, and planning to murder government officials. Seventeen of the accused were absolved, four were given prison sentences, eight were exiled to Africa, two slaves involved were sold and discharged from the military, and five were sentenced to death. On November 8, 1799, four leaders of the conspiracy were publicly hanged.

"The plot and resultant repression demonstrates the divergent goals that previously silent social groups were bringing to the foreground, and the importance of class position in determining the depth of commitment of individual insurgents."

Further reading 
 Allen, Judith Lee. "Tailors, Soldiers, and Slaves: The Social Anatomy of a Conspiracy." M.A. thesis, University of Wisconsin, Madison, 1987.
 Galván, J. (2007). Tailors' revolt. In Encyclopedia of emancipation and abolition in the Transatlantic world. London, United Kingdom: Routledge. Retrieved from http://search.credoreference.com/content/entry/sharpeeman/tailors_revolt/0
 Maxwell, Kenneth R. Conflicts and Conspiracies: Brazil and Portugal, 1750–1808. Cambridge, U.K.: Cambridge University Press, 1974.
Meade, Teresa A History of Modern Latin America 1800 to the Present, United Kingdom, John Wiley & Sons, Inc. 2016. Print.
 Morton, F. W. O. "The Conservative Revolution of Independence: Economy, Society, and Politics in Bahia, 1790–1840." Ph.D. diss., Oxford University, Oxford, U.K., 1974.
 Schwartz, Stuart B. Sugar Plantations in the Formation of Brazilian Society: Bahia, 1550-1835. Cambridge, UK: Cambridge University Press, 1985.

References 

Slave rebellions in Brazil
Colonial Brazil
History of Bahia